Montaquila is a town and comune in the province of Isernia, in the Molise region of southern Italy.

References

External links
Montaquila